Linda Margaret Watson (born September 15, 1955) is a former field hockey player from Zimbabwe, who was a member of the national team that won the gold medal at the 1980 Summer Olympics in Moscow. Watson was also one of Zimbabwe's top hurdlers and sprinters.

Because of the boycott of the United States and other countries, only one team was available to compete in the Women's Field Hockey Tournament: the hosting USSR team. A late request was sent to the government of the African nation, which quickly assembled a team less than a week before the competition started. To everyone's surprise they won, claiming Zimbabwe's only medal in the 1980 Games.

References

External links
 

1955 births
Living people
Zimbabwean female field hockey players
Olympic field hockey players of Zimbabwe
Field hockey players at the 1980 Summer Olympics
Olympic gold medalists for Zimbabwe
Olympic medalists in field hockey
Medalists at the 1980 Summer Olympics
White Zimbabwean sportspeople
Zimbabwean female sprinters
Zimbabwean female hurdlers